Kafan is a  1990 Hindi horror film of Bollywood directed by Dhirendra Bohra. This film was released on 1 August 1990 under the banner of Roop Combine Production company.

Plot
Four friends want to be immortal by way of supernatural power and they ask for this from Tantrik (Black magician). The tantrik tells them to bring a virgin girl for rituals. Two of them find one girl, but they rape her until she faints and take her to the Tantrik. While the ritual starts, the girl transforms to an evil soul and enters into the body of another girl. She kills the Tantrik first and starts killing the friends.

Cast
 Javed Khan
 Raza Murad
 Viju Khote
 Johnny Lever
 Mac Mohan
 Rajesh Vivek
 Tina Ghai
 Huma Khan
 Jamuna

Music
" Yeh Tune Nahi Maine Nahi Jaana" - Udit Narayan, Alka Yagnik
"Zindagi Ka Kya Bharosa" - Sapna Mukherjee

References

External links
 

1990 films
1990s Hindi-language films
Indian horror films
Films scored by Anand–Milind
1990 horror films
Hindi-language horror films